Megamendung is a district (Indonesian: kecamatan) in the Bogor Regency, West Java, Indonesia. Adjoining with neighbouring Cisarua, the district is part of a cluster of tourist and leisure developments best known as the Puncak area. It lies 70 kilometres away from Jakarta, a few kilometres southeast of Bogor, and is considered a mountainous area.

Geography
Much of the district lies in an elevation of 500-600 metres, which moderates the temperature, and causing contrast to the heat of Greater Jakarta and other adjacent low-lying lands. Though much of the built-up area is not necessarily on rugged terrain, uneven ground is the most common terrain as it stands sandwiched between mountains. The area is also proximate to Gunung Gede Pangrango National Park, where a portion of the park itself lies within district boundaries.

Landmarks
Megamendung is most famed for its restaurant and factory outlets, where they have are often frequented by locals, daytrippers and visitors from Jakarta and around. Asides from said clusters, the district are also renowned for its variety of streams that flow down from nearby Mount Pangrango and surrounding mountains.

References

Districts of Bogor Regency